Hunter Glacier is a tributary glacier,  long, draining westward from the central Lanterman Range in the Bowers Mountains of Victoria Land, Antarctica and entering Rennick Glacier at Mount Lugering. It was first mapped by the United States Geological Survey from surveys and U.S. Navy air photos, 1960–62, and was so named by the Advisory Committee on Antarctic Names for Lieutenant Commander William G. Hunter, executive and operations officer with the McMurdo Station winter party in 1964. This glacier lies situated on the Pennell Coast, a portion of Antarctica lying between Cape Williams and Cape Adare.

References

Glaciers of Pennell Coast